Darreh-ye Ebrahim (also Romanized as Darreh-ye Ebrāhīm and Darreh Ebrāhīm) is a village in Shaban Rural District, in the Central District of Nahavand County, Hamadan Province, Iran. At the 2006 census, its population was 473, in 131 families.

References 

Populated places in Nahavand County